Platt Rogers Spencer (also Platt R. Spencer) (November 7, 1800 – May 16, 1864) was the originator of Spencerian penmanship, a popular system of cursive handwriting. He was a teacher and active in the business school movement.

Early life
Spencer was born in East Fishkill, New York, on November 7, 1800. His father, Caleb, died in 1806, and the family moved to Jefferson, Ohio, in 1810. At the time, it was an unsettled area. Platt became passionately fond of writing. Because paper was difficult to obtain at the time, the boy wrote on birch tree bark, sand, ice, snow, the fly-leaves of his mother's Bible and, by permission of a cobbler, the leather in his shop.

Career
In 1815, he taught his first writing class and, from 1816 to 1821, he was a clerk and a book keeper and, from 1821 to 1824, he studied in law, Latin, English literature and penmanship, taught in a common school and wrote up merchants' books. In 1824, he contemplated entering college with a view to preparing for the ministry, but, due to his alcoholism (aggravated by the prevalent drinking customs), he did not.

Spencer taught in New York, where he founded the Spencer Seminary in Jericho, housed in a log cabin.  He also taught in Ohio, where in 1832, he was able to withdraw from alcohol, becoming a total abstainer. He advocated abstaining from alcohol for the remainder of his life. Soon after his reformation, he was elected to public office, and was county treasurer for twelve years. He was instrumental in collecting the early history of Ashtabula County, and was deeply interested in American history. He engaged actively in anti-slavery movements and was an advocate of universal liberty.

Spencer was instrumental in founding the business colleges of the United States and in promoting their growth and development. He combined there his work as a teacher, his system of penmanship for keeping business records and his lectures. Bryant & Stratton Colleges were founded in over 50 cities in the United States by students of Spencer, and Spencer was involved with the institution. In the winter of 1863, Spencer delivered his final lecture before the business college in Brooklyn, New York, and gave his last course of lessons in the business college in New York City. Spencer opened schools in Geneva and Cleveland, Ohio; and in Pittsburgh, Pennsylvania.

Publications
His first publications on penmanship were issued in 1848 under the title Spencer and Rice's System of Business and Ladies' Penmanship, working closely with Victor M. Rice, which was later published under the title Spencerian or Semi-Angular Penmanship. His other publications on penmanship appeared from 1855 to 1863. The New Spencerian Compendium, which was issued in parts, was completed in 1886.

Honors
The Platt Rogers Spencer Papers are located at the Newberry Library in Chicago and the Spencer Archival Room of the Geneva Branch of the Ashtabula County District Library System contains biographical materials on the entire Spencer family.

Spencer also had the honor of having an elementary school named after him. In 1937, the East Geneva Rural School in Geneva changed its name to Platt R. Spencer School. Since 1961 it has served students in grades kindergarten through sixth.

On August 24, 2012, the city of Geneva, Ohio, unveiled the Spencerian Monument at the re-dedication ceremony for the Ashtabula County Western Area Courthouse.

See also

 Copperplate script
 Round hand
 Spencerian Script

References

External links
 

Short biography on Spencer
Spencerian Steel Pen Co.
Platt R. Spencer papers at the Newberry Library in Chicago

1800 births
1864 deaths
American calligraphers
Penmanship
People from Dutchess County, New York
People from Jefferson, Ohio
Clerks